KLNT (1490 AM) is a Spanish christian radio station that serves the Laredo, Texas, United States and Nuevo Laredo, Tamaulipas, Mexico border area.

History
1490 AM signed on in 1952 as the original KVOZ. It broadcast with 250 watts. Barely a year after signing on, KVOZ attempted a move to 1240 kHz that was contingent on KGBS, the existing station at 1240 (now defunct), surrendering its license; this was denied. Power was increased to 1,000 watts in 1970.

In 1988, KVOZ finally got its move and headed for newly built 890 AM. 1490 was relaunched as KDOS at that time and became KLNT in 1998, coinciding with a relaunch as a news/talk station.

KLNT went silent on December 6, 2020, due to technical issues with the station's transmitter. It returned in August 2021.  The station flipped to Spanish christian in October 2021.

References

LNT
Radio stations established in 1952
1952 establishments in Texas